Sonid Right Banner (Mongolian:    Söned Baraɣun qosiɣu) is a banner of Inner Mongolia, China, bordering Dornogovi Province of the Republic of Mongolia to the northwest. It is under the administration of Xilin Gol League. Sunud Mongols inhabit it.

History

For a few months in 1945, it was the capital of the Inner Mongolian People's Republic, before it was taken over by the Communist Chinese government.

Townships
Saihantala (Banner seat) 
Zhurihe 
Bayanshutu

Climate

References

Websites

www.xzqh.org 

Banners of Inner Mongolia